Puddington is a small village in Mid Devon within the Witheridge hundred . It is approximately nine miles from the town of Tiverton and 8 Miles from Crediton. During the reign of Edward (1003-1066) the land was held by Aethelweard. 

Puddington or Potitone was mentioned in the Domesday book as being held by Ralph De Pomeroy for William Chevre/Cheever (his brother). It paid geld for 1 hide, had land for 8 ploughs, 3 slaves, 8 villains, 6 borders, 9 acres of meadow, 5 acres of pasture and 2 acres of scrubland. The land escheated to the crown during the reign of King Henry 1 (1100-1135) who granted them to his illegitimate son William 1 de Tracy (Died c1136). The grandson of William 1 de Tracy was one of the 4 knights responsible for the murder of Thomas a Becket, this could be the reason for the 15th Century church in the village being consecrated to St Thomas of Canterbury. The building has grade 2 listed status.
 
Puddington" means "estate associated with a man named Putta".

References

External links

Villages in Devon